Academy FM may refer to either:

 Academy FM (Thanet), serving the district of Thanet in Kent and started broadcasting in 2010
 Academy FM (Folkestone), serving the town of Folkestone in Kent and started broadcasting in 2011